The Czech Rugby League Association is the governing body for the sport of rugby league football in Czech Republic. The Association was formed during 4 October 2005. In 2011, the Czech Rugby League Association was admitted to affiliate membership of the Rugby League European Federation after reforming its governance.

See also

 Rugby league in the Czech Republic
 Czech Republic national rugby league team

References

External links

Rugby league governing bodies in Europe
Rugby league in the Czech Republic
Rugby League
Sports organizations established in 2005